Arts in the Armed Forces, Inc. (AITAF) was a non-profit based in Brooklyn, New York that brings arts programming to active-duty service members, veterans, military support staff of the United States and their families around the world free of charge.

The organization was founded by actors Adam Driver and Joanne Tucker in 2006. The non-profit became an official incorporation in 2008.

AITAF served all branches of the military at US installations domestically and abroad. They chose content that features diverse themes, ages, ethnicities and experiences. Following each of AITAF’s events, the artists would interact with the audience through a question and answer session.

AITAF’s mission was to "honor and enrich the lives of the US military community by offering powerful shared experiences in theater and film. Featuring professional artists and contemporary American content, creating space for meaningful dialogue, igniting connection and deepening our capacity for understanding around our common humanity."

The Bridge Awards 

In 2018, The Bridge Award for Playwriting was established in honor of AITAF's tenth anniversary with the purpose of recognizing an emerging playwright of exceptional talent within the United States military. The biennial (as of 2020) award consists of a $10,000 prize, and an AITAF produced reading of the winning work.

In addition to bringing world-class theater to the military, AITAF is committed to supporting and sharing the talents of those who serve. This Award offers a deserving current military service member or veteran artist important connections with the theater community and access to developmental resources, helping to facilitate a deeper understanding and more active dialogue between military and civilian communities.

The Bridge Award for Playwriting winner is chosen by a selection committee, judged each year by a notable playwright. Past judges include Pulitzer Prize winners Suzan-Lori Parks and Tony Kushner.

2018 Bridge Award Winner: WAR STORIES by Vinnie Lyman (U.S. Army Veteran)

2019 Bridge Award Winner: TAMPONS, DEAD DOGS, AND OTHER DISPOSABLE THINGS by Shairi Engle (U.S. Air Force Veteran)

2020 Bridge Award Winner: LOCAL GODS by Anton Sattler (U.S. Marine Corps Veteran)

The Bridge Award for Screenwriting was established in 2020. This biennial Award is open to all persons who are currently serving or have served in the United States military, regardless of age, experience, or background. This Award seeks to identify and encourage talented screenwriters/filmmakers from the military community. First time screenwriters are encouraged to apply, and the Award is particularly interested in elevating and celebrating underrepresented voices and stories. The Award gives aspiring filmmakers with a military background the resources and mentorship to advance their visions and refine their work. It encourages members of the military community to conceive of themselves as artists and to tell their important and powerful stories.

This Award was created as a cinematic corollary to AITAF’s successful Bridge Award for Playwriting.

In Media 
AITAF was the subject of a short documentary produced by Vice News in 2015. The documentary chronicles the organization's first trip to perform in the Middle East at Camp Arifjan, a United States Army installation in Kuwait.

In 2016, Driver gave a TED Talk that discussed the non-profit at length and which ended with an AITAF reading.

Following the release of Star Wars: The Rise of Skywalker, fans of the franchise donated over $90,000 to the charity. Driver released a video thanking fans for their donations.

Programming

List of previously involved artists

References



Non-profit organizations based in New York City
Military-related organizations
Performing arts